Inioteuthis is a genus of bobtail squid comprising three species.

Species
Genus Inioteuthis
Inioteuthis capensis Voss, 1962. Native to Namibia and South Africa.
Inioteuthis japonica (Tilesius in Férussac & d'Orbigny, 1845). Native to China, Taiwan, and Japan.
Inioteuthis maculosa Goodrich, 1896. Native to India, Sri Lanka, Bangladesh, Pakistan, Myanmar, Thailand, Taiwan, Maldives, Iran, Iraq, Kuwait, Bahrain, Qatar, Oman, Saudi Arabia, United Arab Emirates, Philippines, Indonesia, Malaysia, Yemen, and Somalia.
Species brought into synonymy
 Inioteuthis morsei Verrill, 1881: synonym of Euprymna morsei (Verrill, 1881)

References

External links

  Young, Richard E. and Michael Vecchione. 2004. Inioteuthis Verrill, 1881. Version 2 September 2004

Bobtail squid
Cephalopod genera
Bioluminescent molluscs